Ocean Ridge is a town in Palm Beach County, Florida, United States. The population was 1,786 at the 2010 census. As of 2018, the population recorded by the U.S. Census Bureau is 1,956. It is part of the Miami Metropolitan Area.

Geography

Ocean Ridge is a small coastal community along US Hwy A1A. It lies 1.6 miles north of Briny Breezes, 1.3 miles east of Boynton Beach and 4.3 miles south of South Palm Beach.  To the east lies the Atlantic Ocean.

History
Ocean Ridge was founded in 1931 as the Town of Boynton Beach, which was originally part of the Town of Boynton.  Major Nathan S. Boynton toured the area in 1894, and established the Boynton Beach Hotel in 1897.  The town of Boynton was incorporated in 1920.  Due to disputes over beach area property taxes and the Town of Boynton's rising debt load, twelve homes created the Town of Boynton Beach in 1931.  But in 1937, the Town Commission called a special emergency meeting over changing Boynton Beach's name, because mail was being missent to Daytona Beach due to the similarities in name.  Marion White Bird, the daughter of then Mayor Michael White, suggested the name "Ocean Ridge" and won a contest for choosing a new name.  The name was officially changed to "Ocean Ridge" in 1939.  Two years later, the Town of Boynton itself changed its name, to "Boynton Beach".

Demographics

2020 census

As of the 2020 United States census, there were 1,830 people, 762 households, and 444 families residing in the town.

2000 census
As of the census of 2000, there were 1,636 people, 875 households, and 494 families residing in the town. The racial makeup of the town was 98.35% White (95.7% were Non-Hispanic White,) 0.12% African American, 0.55% Asian, 0.12% Pacific Islander, 0.43% from other races, and 0.43% from two or more races. Hispanic or Latino of any race were 2.93% of the population.

There were 875 households, out of which 11.4% had children under the age of 18 living with them, 52.1% were married couples living together, 3.5% had a female householder with no husband present, and 43.5% were non-families. 37.5% of all households were made up of individuals, and 17.6% had someone living alone who was 65 years of age or older. The average household size was 1.87 and the average family size was 2.41.

In the town, the population was spread out, with 10.3% under the age of 18, 1.8% from 18 to 24, 18.5% from 25 to 44, 33.6% from 45 to 64, and 35.8% who were 65 years of age or older. The median age was 57 years. For every 100 females, there were 94.8 males. For every 100 females age 18 and over, there were 90.9 males.

The median income for a household in the town was $70,625, and the median income for a family was $99,184. Males had a median income of $91,198 versus $31,607 for females. The per capita income for the town was $76,088. About 2.6% of families and 4.7% of the population were below the poverty line, including none of those under age 18 and 5.4% of those age 65 or over.

As of 2000, speakers of English as a first language accounted for 91.09% of all residents, while French consisted of 3.45%, Spanish was at  3.10%, German at 1.38%, Persian Language was at 1.5%, and Italian made up 0.96% of the population.

As of 2000, Ocean Ridge had the nineteenth highest percentage of Canadian residents in the US, with 1.70% of the population (tied with twenty-nine other US areas, including Palm Beach Shores.)

References

External links
 Town of Ocean Ridge

Towns in Palm Beach County, Florida
Populated coastal places in Florida on the Atlantic Ocean
Towns in Florida